Félix Eduardo Escalona (born 12 March 1979) is a Venezuelan baseball coach and former Major League Baseball shortstop and second baseman. He is the first base coach for the Navegantes del Magallanes of the Venezuelan Professional Baseball League.

Career
In , Escalona was claimed off waivers by the Baltimore Orioles, but did not play in the majors for them.

In , Escalona signed a minor league contract with the New York Yankees and was invited to spring training. He started the season with the Triple-A Columbus Clippers and was recalled to the majors in September. Escalona was released by the Yankees during the  season.

In , Escalona signed with the Ottawa Rapidz of the Can-Am League, but was released on July 6, 2008.

In February , Escalona signed with the De Angelis Godo of Italy's Serie A1.

In a four-season major league career, Escalona was a .209 hitter with 13 RBI and 20 runs in 84 games.

See also
 List of Major League Baseball players from Venezuela

External links

MLB profile
ESPN
Pura Pelota
Release from Rapidz
Retrosheet

1979 births
Living people
Águilas del Zulia players
Auburn Doubledays players
Bowie Baysox players
Columbus Clippers players
De Angelis Godo players
Gulf Coast Astros players
Kissimmee Cobras players
Lexington Legends players
Major League Baseball infielders
Major League Baseball players from Venezuela
Major League Baseball shortstops
Michigan Battle Cats players
Navegantes del Magallanes players
New York Yankees players
Orlando Rays players
Ottawa Lynx players
Ottawa Rapidz players
People from Puerto Cabello
Tampa Bay Devil Rays players
Tiburones de La Guaira players
Trenton Thunder players
Venezuelan expatriate baseball players in Canada
Venezuelan expatriate baseball players in the United States